Muang Sam Sip is a district (amphoe) in the northwestern part of Ubon Ratchathani province, northeastern Thailand.

History
In 1909 the government merged Kasem Sima and Utarupala Nikhom Districts together and named the new district Utara Ubon. Four years later, the district name was changed back to Kasem Sima. The district office was moved to Ban Muang Sam Sip in 1917, so the district name was changed to fit with the new location. The government built a new the district office there in 1924. The present district office was rebuilt in 1993 in the same area.

Geography
Neighboring districts are (from the east clockwise) Lao Suea Kok, Mueang Ubon Ratchathani, Khueang Nai of Ubon Ratchathani Province and Hua Taphan, Lue Amnat and Phana of Amnat Charoen province.

The important water resources are the Se Bok and Se Bai Rivers.

Administration
The district is divided into 14 sub-districts (tambons), which are further subdivided into 158 villages (mubans). Muang Sam Sip is a township (thesaban tambon) which covers parts of tambon Muang Sam Sip. There are an additional 14 tambon administrative organizations (TAO).

References

External links
amphoe.com

Muang Sam Sip